Kličevac (Serbian Cyrillic: Кличевац) is a village in the municipality of Požarevac, Serbia. According to the 2002 census, the village has a population of 1,329 people. Population is mainly ethnically Serbian, and main occupations are agriculture and trade. Many of the Kličevac residents have moved out, becoming year-round guest-workers in Austria, Germany, Switzerland and Italy. Kličevac has a school, grades K-8, serving children from nearby village of Rečica as well.

One legend states that village derives its name from the word "ključ", meaning key. Legend has it that a dignitary of the Ottoman Turkish government lost the keys to his harem while passing through this previously unnamed village. As these keys meant quite a bit to him, his entourage raised quite an alarm, enlisting the local population to find the keys. Another version of this legend attributes the name to the verb "kliče"—to shout, presumably for the same lost harem keys.

The location of Kličevac, along a branch of the river Danube was attractive to Romans as well. The area is still ripe with thousand-year old Roman remnants, from less significant ones like Roman road bricks, to more interesting ones but rarer, like coins, jewelry, and pottery shards. The villagers have been known to unearth Roman relics while working their fields.

A Bronze Age figurine "The Idol of Kličevac" was found in a grave in the village. It was destroyed during World War I.

One notable resident of Klicevac was Vojvoda (Duke) Milenko Stojkovic, a guerrilla commander during the First Serbian Uprising against the (Ottoman) Turks.

References

Populated places in Braničevo District